The women's trampoline competition of the trampoline events at the 2011 Pan American Games was held between October 17–18 at the Nissan Gymnastics Stadium. The draw for the competition took place on August 1, 2011, in Guadalajara. The defending Pan American Games champion was Karen Cockburn of Canada.

Schedule
All times are Central Standard Time (UTC-6).

Results

Qualification

Final

References

Gymnastics at the 2011 Pan American Games
2011 in women's gymnastics